Goo is a recently discovered Mande language of Ivory Coast. It is close to Dan and Tura, but intelligible with neither. It is spoken in ten villages.

References

Mande languages
Languages of Ivory Coast